The equals sign (British English, Unicode) or equal sign (American English), also known as the equality sign, is the mathematical symbol , which is used to indicate equality in some well-defined sense. In an equation, it is placed between two expressions that have the same value, or for which one studies the conditions under which they have the same value.

In Unicode and ASCII, it has the code point U+003D. It was invented in 1557 by Robert Recorde.

History
The etymology of the word "equal" is from the Latin word "æqualis", as meaning "uniform", "identical", or "equal", from aequus ("level", "even", or "just").

The  symbol, now universally accepted in mathematics for equality, was first recorded by Welsh mathematician Robert Recorde in The Whetstone of Witte (1557). The original form of the symbol was much wider than the present form. In his book Recorde explains his design of the "Gemowe lines" (meaning twin lines, from the Latin gemellus)

"The symbol  was not immediately popular.

Usage in mathematics and computer programming
In mathematics, the equal sign can be used as a simple statement of fact in a specific case, or to create definitions, conditional statements, or to express a universal equivalence.

The first important computer programming language to use the equal sign was the original version of Fortran, FORTRAN I, designed in 1954 and implemented in 1957.

A rival programming-language usage was pioneered by the original version of ALGOL, which was designed in 1958 and implemented in 1960. The equal sign was reserved for this usage.

Both usages have remained common in different programming languages into the early 21st century. As well as Fortran,  is used for assignment in such languages as C, Perl, Python, awk, and their descendants. But  is used for equality and not assignment in the Pascal family, Ada, Eiffel, APL, and other languages.

A few languages, such as BASIC and PL/I, have used the equal sign to mean both assignment and equality, distinguished by context. However, in most languages where  has one of these meanings, a different character or, more often, a sequence of characters is used for the other meaning. Following ALGOL, most languages that use  for equality use  for assignment, although APL, with its special character set, uses a left-pointing arrow.

Fortran did not have an equality operator (it was only possible to compare an expression to zero, using the arithmetic IF statement) until FORTRANIV was released in 1962, since when it has used the four characters  to test for equality.

The equal sign is also used in defining attribute–value pairs, in which an attribute is assigned a value.

Several equal signs
In PHP, the triple equal sign, denotes value and type equality, meaning that not only do the two expressions evaluate to equal values, but they are also of the same data type. For instance, the expression  is true, but  is not, because the number 0 is an integer value whereas false is a Boolean value.

However, in JavaScript the behavior of  cannot be described by any simple consistent rules. The expression  is true, but  is false, even though both sides of the  act the same in Boolean context.

In Ruby, equality under  requires both operands to be of identical type, e.g.  is false. The  operator is flexible and may be defined arbitrarily for any given type. Under these semantics, === is non-symmetric; e.g. 1844 === (1800..1899) is false, since it is interpreted to mean Integer#=== rather than Range#===.

In most programming languages, == is used to check equality, so 1844 == 1844 will return true.

Other uses

Spelling

Tone letter
The equal sign is also used as a grammatical tone letter in the orthographies of Budu in the Congo-Kinshasa, in Krumen, Mwan and Dan in the Ivory Coast. The Unicode character used for the tone letter (U+A78A) is different from the mathematical symbol (U+003D).

Personal names

A possibly unique case of the equal sign of European usage in a person's name, specifically in a double-barreled name, was by pioneer aviator Alberto Santos-Dumont, as he is also known not only to have often used a double hyphen  resembling an equal sign  between his two surnames in place of a hyphen, but also seems to have personally preferred that practice, to display equal respect for his father's French ethnicity and the Brazilian ethnicity of his mother.

Instead of a double hyphen, the equal sign is sometimes used in Japanese as a separator between names. In Ojibwe, the readily available equal sign on a keyboard is used as a substitute for a double hyphen.

Linguistics 
In linguistic interlinear glosses, an equal sign is conventionally used to mark clitic boundaries: the equal sign is placed between the clitic and the word that the clitic is attached to.

Chemistry
In chemical formulas, the two parallel lines denoting a double bond are commonly rendered using an equal sign.

LGBT symbol

In recent years, the equal sign has been used to symbolize LGBT rights. The symbol has been used since 1995 by the Human Rights Campaign, which lobbies for marriage equality, and subsequently by the United Nations Free & Equal, which promotes LGBT rights at the United Nations.

Hate speech
The not equal (≠) symbol has been adopted by some white supremacist and other racist groups.

Telegrams and Telex
In Morse code, the equal sign is encoded by the letters B (-...) and T (-) run together (-...-). The letters BT stand for Break Text, and are put between paragraphs, or groups of paragraphs in messages sent via Telex, a standardised tele-typewriter. The sign, used to mean Break Text, is given at the end of a telegram to separate the text of the message from the signature.

Related symbols

Approximately equal

Symbols used to denote items that are approximately equal include the following:
 ≈ (LaTeX \approx)
 ≅ (LaTeX \cong), another combination of ≈ and =, which is also sometimes used to indicate isomorphism or congruence
 ∼ (LaTeX \sim), which is also sometimes used to indicate proportionality or similarity, being related by an equivalence relation, or to indicate that a random variable is distributed according to a specific probability distribution (see also tilde)
 ∽ (LaTex \backsim), which is also used to indicate proportionality
 ≐ (LaTeX \doteq), which can also be used to represent the approach of a variable to a limit
 ≒ (LaTeX \fallingdotseq), commonly used in Japan, Taiwan, and Korea.
 ≓ (LaTex \risingdotseq)

In some areas of East Asia such as Japan, "≒" is used to mean "the two terms are almost equal", but in other areas and specialized literature such as mathematics, "≃" is often used. In addition to its mathematical meaning, it is sometimes used in Japanese sentences with the intention of "almost the same."

Not equal
The symbol used to denote inequation (when items are not equal) is a slashed equal sign  (U+2260). In LaTeX, this is done with the "\neq" command.

Identity

Isomorphism
The symbol  is often used to indicate isomorphic algebraic structures or congruent geometric figures.

In logic

Other related symbols
Additional precomposed symbols with code points in Unicode for notations related to the equal sign include:

 ≌
 ≔ (see also assignment (computer science) for )
 ≕
 ≖
 ≗

 ≘
 ≙
 ≚
 ≛
 ≜

 ≞
 ≟
 ⩴ (see also Backus–Naur form for )
 ⩵
 ⩶

Incorrect usage
The equal sign is sometimes used incorrectly within a mathematical argument to connect math steps in a non-standard way, rather than to show equality (especially by early mathematics students).

For example, if one were finding the sum, step by step, of the numbers 1, 2, 3, 4, and 5, one might incorrectly write
1 + 2 = 3 + 3 = 6 + 4 = 10 + 5 = 15.
Structurally, this is shorthand for
([(1 + 2 = 3) + 3 = 6] + 4 = 10) + 5 = 15,
but the notation is incorrect, because each part of the equality has a different value. If interpreted strictly as it says, it would imply that
3 = 6 = 10 = 15 = 15.
A correct version of the argument would be
1 + 2 = 3, 3 + 3 = 6, 6 + 4 = 10, 10 + 5 = 15.

This difficulty results from subtly different uses of the sign in education. In early, arithmetic-focused grades, the equal sign may be operational; like the equal button on an electronic calculator, it demands the result of a calculation. Starting in algebra courses, the sign takes on a relational meaning of equality between two calculations. Confusion between the two uses of the sign sometimes persists at the university level.

Encodings
 
Related:

See also

 2 + 2 = 5
 Double hyphen
 Equality (mathematics)
 Logical equality
 Plus and minus signs

Notes

References

 Boyer, C. B.: A History of Mathematics, 2nd ed. rev. by Uta C. Merzbach. New York: Wiley, 1989  (1991 pbk ed. )

External links
Earliest Uses of Symbols of Relation
Image of the page of The Whetstone of Witte on which the equal sign is introduced
Scientific Symbols, Icons, Mathematical Symbols
Robert Recorde invents the equal sign

Mathematical symbols
Welsh inventions
1557 introductions
Definition
Assignment operations
Equivalence (mathematics)